VFL Women's (VFLW) is the major state-level women's Australian rules football league in Victoria. The league initially comprised the six premier division clubs and the top four division 1 clubs from the now-defunct Victorian Women's Football League (VWFL), and has since evolved into what is also the second primary competition for AFL Women's (AFLW) clubs in Victoria. The competition has been held concurrently with the AFLW since 2021.

Following the 2017 season, the VFL Women's was reconfigured to affiliate teams more closely with AFL clubs. Since 2021, twelve teams have appeared in the competition; all ten Victorian AFL clubs either field their own women's team or have an affiliation of sorts with an existing club in the VFLW, with the other teams being VFL-affiliated  and independent club .

The competition was not held in 2020 due to the impact of the COVID-19 pandemic; the grand final was also cancelled in 2021 due to the pandemic, with no premiership being awarded.

History
AFL Victoria launched the VFL Women's competition on 21 March 2016, with its inaugural season featuring twelve doubleheaders with the Victorian Football League (VFL). The league initially comprised the six Premier Division clubs (Eastern Devils, St Kilda Sharks and ) and 2015's top four Division 1 clubs (and ) from the Victorian Women's Football League (VWFL). Melbourne University already had an existing partnership with Australian Football League (AFL) club .

Following the inaugural AFL Women's (AFLW) season in 2017, the league made further changes to the competition to affiliate clubs more directly with AFL clubs and the AFL Women's competition.

In 2019, 's AFLW team played five invitational matches in Victoria against teams having a bye. Following the 2019 season, AFL Northern Territory ended Northern Territory's involvement in the NEAFL and VFLW competitions, and Williamstown aligned with Adelaide in Northern Territory's place. In 2020, amidst the COVID-19 pandemic, AFL Victoria decided to cancel the 2020 VFL Women's season and instead hold a four-team Super Series in September to give 120 footballers the chance to push their case to be selected in the 2020 AFL Women's draft; this was later cancelled as well due to the increase of restrictions around COVID-19 in Victoria.

In 2021,  joined the league, replacing Richmond, which initially left the competition due to financial issues before entering into a formal alignment with the VFL club. The competition also shifted to a February commencement, running concurrently with the AFLW season and mirroring other second-tier leagues like the SANFL Women's and WAFL Women's. In 2023, the competition shifted to a March commencement, and Hawthorn reverted to its former name, Box Hill.

Clubs

Current clubs

Former clubs
  (2016–2017)
  (2016–2017)
 Eastern Devils (2016–2017)
  (2016)
  (2016)
  (2016–2019)
  (2018–2019)
  (2018–2020)
  (2016–2017)
 St Kilda Sharks (2016–2017)

Honours

Premiers

 2016: 
 2017: 
 2018: 
 2019: 
 2022:

Lambert–Pearce Medal

 2016: Daisy Pearce
 2017: Katie Brennan
 2018: Jess Duffin
 2019: Lauren Pearce
 2021: Georgia Nanscawen
 2022: Georgia Nanscawen

See also
 AFL Women's
 Victorian Football League
 Victorian Women's Football League

References

External links
 

VFL Women's
Women's Australian rules football leagues in Australia
Australian rules football competitions in Victoria
2016 establishments in Australia
Sports competitions in Melbourne
Sports leagues established in 2016